The Inirida worm lizard (Mesobaena huebneri) is a worm lizard species in the family Amphisbaenidae. It is found in Venezuela and Colombia.

References

Mesobaena
Reptiles of Colombia
Reptiles of Venezuela
Reptiles described in 1925
Taxa named by Robert Mertens